Manon Meunier (born 30 March 1996) is a French politician from La France Insoumise. She was elected as a deputy for Haute-Vienne's 3rd constituency in the 2022 French legislative election.

See also 

 List of deputies of the 16th National Assembly of France

References 

Living people
1996 births
People from Limoges
21st-century French politicians
21st-century French women politicians
Deputies of the 16th National Assembly of the French Fifth Republic
La France Insoumise politicians
Women members of the National Assembly (France)
Members of Parliament for Haute-Vienne